Tabriz Shahid Madani International Airport  is an airport that serves Tabriz, Iran. It is the primary airport of Tabriz. The runway of the airport is also used by Tactical Air Base 2 of the Islamic Republic of Iran Air Force.

Airlines and destinations

Accidents and incidents
 On 6 June 2018 the Tapandegan (Palpitaters in Persian), an Iranian hacker group, hacked the arrival and departure monitors at Tabriz International Airport, and defaced sign boards in the evening, showing a protest message against “wasting Iranians’ resources" and expressing support for Iranian truckers who had been on strike across Iran for several weeks.

See also
Iran Civil Aviation Organization
Transport in Iran
List of airports in Iran
List of the busiest airports in Iran
List of airlines of Iran

References

External links 
  Tabriz International Airport official website

Airports in Iran
Buildings and structures in Tabriz
Transportation in East Azerbaijan Province
Transport in Tabriz